Nansanhuan is a metro station of Zhengzhou Metro Line 2.

"Nansanhuan" refers to the South 3rd Ring Road, which is a long road. Just like Xisanhuan, the naming of this station is controversial on some local forums.

Station layout 
The 2-level underground station has a single island platform. The station concourse is on the B1 level and the B2 level is for the platforms.

Exits

References 

Stations of Zhengzhou Metro
Line 2, Zhengzhou Metro
Railway stations in China opened in 2016